Friedrich Otto Büttner (1824 Garz – 1880 Grabow) was a German entomologist who specialised in Lepidoptera .  He  wrote the original description of Stenoptilia pneumonanthes in Die Pommerschen, insbesondere die Stettiner Microlepidoptern. Entomologische Zeitung 41: 383–473. Stettin. (1880).Friedrich Büttner was a Member of the Stettin Entomological Society. By profession he was a teacher.

References 
Groll, E. K. 2017: Biographies of the Entomologists of the World. – Online database, version 8, Senckenberg Deutsches Entomologisches Institut, Müncheberg – URL: sdei.senckenberg.de/biografies
Anonym 1880: [Buttner, F. O.] Entomologische Zeitung, Stettin 41, pp. 483–484

German lepidopterists
1880 deaths
1824 births
19th-century German zoologists
People from Garz (Rügen)